Keith Eddy (23 October 1944 – 10 October 2022) was an English professional footballer who played as a midfielder for Barrow, Watford and Sheffield United in England, as well as the New York Cosmos in the United States. He went on to manage the Toronto Blizzard in the NASL from 1979 to 1981, and in retirement founded the Tulsa Soccer Club.

Career
Born in Barrow-in-Furness, Lancashire, Eddy began playing football at the age of eight, and turned professional at 17. He made 482 appearances in the Football League for Barrow, Watford and Sheffield United. He was then signed by the New York Cosmos as part of a squad strengthening program following the arrival of Pelé; fellow British players to sign with the Cosmos at the same time included Tony Field, Dave Clements and Terry Garbett. Eddy spent two seasons with the Cosmos, making 30 appearances in the NASL, becoming captain of a team which included Pelé, Franz Beckenbauer and Giorgio Chinaglia. In 1977, he left the Cosmos but was first named as NASL all–star in 1976.

Eddy became head coach of the Toronto Blizzard during their first season under that name. They finished with a 14–16 record, reaching the playoffs but being knocked out by his former club, the Cosmos. He resigned in 1981, after the team fell to a 4–14 record placing them in bottom place in the North American Soccer League.

Later life and death
Retiring from professional football, Eddy founded Tulsa Soccer Club, an organisation which promotes development in soccer in Oklahoma. Originally formed with four teams, it expanded and as of 2011, featured some thirty teams.

Eddy died on 10 October 2022, at the age of 77.

References

1944 births
2022 deaths
Footballers from Barrow-in-Furness
English footballers
Footballers from Cumbria
Association football midfielders
English Football League players
North American Soccer League (1968–1984) players
Barrow A.F.C. players
Watford F.C. players
Sheffield United F.C. players
New York Cosmos players
English football managers
North American Soccer League (1968–1984) coaches
Toronto Blizzard managers
English expatriate footballers
English expatriate football managers
English expatriate sportspeople in the United States
Expatriate soccer players in the United States
English expatriate sportspeople in Canada
Expatriate soccer managers in Canada